is a passenger railway station located in the city of Shikokuchūō, Ehime Prefecture, Japan. It is operated by JR Shikoku and has the station number "Y26".

Lines
Iyo-Doi Station is served by the JR Shikoku Yosan Line and is located 88.6 km from the beginning of the line at Takamatsu. Yosan line local, Rapid Sunport, and Nanpū Relay services stop at the station.

Layout
The station consists of an island platform serving two tracks. A station building beside the tracks is unstaffed and serves only as a waiting room. Access to the island platform is by means of a level crossing. A passing siding runs to the side of platform/line 1 and it is necessary to cross it on the way to the island platform. Several other dead-end sidings branch of the tracks.

Adjacent stations

History
At that time the station was operated by Japanese Government Railways, later becoming Japanese National Railways (JNR). With the privatization of JNR on 1 April 1987, control of the station passed to JR Shikoku.

Surrounding area
Japan National Route 11
 Enmei-ji Temple
Ehime Prefectural Doi High School
Shikokuchuo Municipal Doi Junior High School
Shikokuchuo Municipal Doi Elementary School

See also
 List of railway stations in Japan

References

External links
 Station timetable

Railway stations in Ehime Prefecture
Railway stations in Japan opened in 1919
Shikokuchūō